Victor Arthur Wilson (14 April 1931 – 14 January 2001) was a British racing driver.

Born in Hull and raised in South Africa, Wilson participated in two Formula One World Championship Grands Prix, the 1960 Italian Grand Prix at Monza and the 1966 Belgian Grand Prix at Spa-Francorchamps. In the former, he drove a private Cooper-Climax and retired just before half-distance, while in the latter he was entered in a private BRM but was forced to give his car to American Bob Bondurant before the race. He also participated in some non-Championship Formula One races.

After racing, Wilson worked as a motor dealer before dying in a motor accident at Gerrards Cross, Buckinghamshire.

Complete Formula One World Championship results
(key) 

‡ The car was driven in the race by Bob Bondurant.

References

1931 births
2001 deaths
English racing drivers
English Formula One drivers